Cameron McGlinchey (born 19 September 1975) is an Australian drummer who serves as one of the members of the alternative rock band Rogue Traders. Originally, McGlinchey only played as a touring member, but by 2005, he joined as an official member. He was a member of Maeder and has previously toured with NoKTuRNL and former Young Talent Time singer Natalie Miller. McGlinchey left the Rogue Traders in 2008. Since he left the band, he has started going around for the Whitelion ROAR program.

Personal life
McGlinchey is married to Rogue Traders lead singer Natalie Bassingthwaighte. On 16 August 2010, Bassingthwaighte gave birth to their first child, daughter Harper Rain Sinclair McGlinchey. In May 2013, their second child, a son named Hendrix John Hickson McGlinchey was born

References 

1975 births
Living people
Australian musicians